Omorgus setosipennis is a species of hide beetle in the subfamily Omorginae.

References

setosipennis
Beetles described in 1904